The Columbia Lions baseball team is a varsity intercollegiate athletic team of Columbia University in New York City. The team is a member of the Ivy League, which is part of the National Collegiate Athletic Association's Division I. Columbia's first baseball team was fielded in 1868. The team plays its home games at Robertson Field at Satow Stadium in New York City. The Lions are coached by Brett Boretti.

History

Lou Gehrig

The most famous member of the Columbia baseball team was Lou Gehrig. Gehrig attended Columbia between 1921 and 1923, intending to become an engineer. Known as "Columbia Lou," Gehrig played both baseball and football. Gehrig drew attention for his record-breaking 400-foot home runs and, as a pitcher, his 17-game strikeout streak in 1923. Gehrig signed with the Yankees in his sophomore year, leaving college for a lucrative paycheck, but remained an avid fan of Columbia sports for the remainder of his life.

Before Gehrig, Hall of Famer Eddie Collins also played for Columbia.

Major League Baseball
Columbia has had 27 Major League Baseball Draft selections since the draft began in 1965.

See also
List of NCAA Division I baseball programs

References

External links
 

 
Baseball teams established in 1868